The simple-station San Façon-Carrera 22 is part of the TransMilenio mass-transit system of Bogotá, Colombia, opened in the year 2003.

Location

The station is located close to downtown Bogotá, more specifically on the Troncal Calle 13 between Carreras 21 and 23.

History

The station was opened in 2003 as part of the opening of Main Line Calle 13 from the De La Sabana station to Puente Aranda.

Station services

Old trunk services

Main line service

Feeder routes

This station does not have connections to feeder routes.

Inter-city service

This station does not have inter-city service.

External links
TransMilenio

See also
Bogotá
TransMilenio
List of TransMilenio stations

TransMilenio